The UCF Soccer and Track Stadium is a multi-purpose stadium located on the main campus of the University of Central Florida in Orlando, Florida, United States. The 2,000-seat stadium is home to the UCF Knights track and field, cross country and soccer teams. The Knights compete in the American Athletic Conference (The American).

Location

The stadium is located within Knights Plaza, which is a part of UCF's Athletic Village. Also located within Knights Plaza is Addition Financial Arena, the indoor arena of UCF Knights basketball, The Venue, the indoor arena of UCF Knights volleyball, John Euliano Park, the home field of UCF Knights baseball, and the Towers residence halls, which house 2,000 UCF students, including student-athletes. To the east of the complex is FBC Mortgage Stadium, home of the UCF Knights football team.

History

The stadium was built in 1991, and during the summer of 2004, the track was resurfaced and enhanced. The complex underwent another further renovation in 2008, adding long jump and triple jump pits as well as an expanded throwing area.

In 2011, the stadium was heavily renovated, boasting a 2,000 seat capacity with a new 1,475-seat stand, press box,  clubhouse, restrooms and new entrance on the west side of the facility. The original 500-seat stand was retained as a visitors' stand. The renovated stadium opened in May 2011.

The soccer field is made of natural grass and measures  x . The complex includes throwing areas for the hammer, discus, shot put, long jump, and triple jump pits.

International soccer matches
UCF Soccer and Track Stadium hosted its first international soccer match on January 16, 2015.

See also
UCF Knights
University of Central Florida
University of Central Florida Alumni

References

External links
UCF Soccer and Track Stadium Information at UCF Athletics
UCF Knights Athletics website
University of Central Florida School website

University of Central Florida
Athletics (track and field) venues in Florida
College track and field venues in the United States
Sports venues in Orlando, Florida
Soccer venues in Florida
National Premier Soccer League stadiums
1991 establishments in Florida
Sports venues completed in 1991
UCF Knights soccer
UCF Knights track and field